Thierry Cygan (born April 4, 1975 in Lens, Pas-de-Calais) is a former French defender for SO Cholet.

Career
In the 1996-1997 season, he played 24 matches and won the Championnat National with ES Wasquehal. He then played 5 seasons in the Ligue 2 for Wasquehal. In 2002, he was signed up by Angers SCO.

While playing for SCO in the 2002-2003 season, he finishes as the runner-up in the National. As a result, SCO is promoted to the Ligue 2 under the leadership of Eric Guerit. After two seasons in the Ligue 2, the club is relegated once again.

In 2008, after SCO finished the season on the 10th spot, the club fires him after six seasons spent in the Maine-et-Loire.

In November 2008, Thierry Cygan signed a one-year-and-a-half deal with AS Cherbourg. He played his first game in the Coupe de France against Vannes OC on November 22, 2008 (final score:1-3, after extra time).

After the club is relegated to the CFA, Cygan joined SO Cholet in the CFA2.

He retired in 2011 and in 2012 he was appointed the coach of USSCA Champtocé in the French Regional Football League (DRH).

Career

Personal life
Thierry is the younger brother of Pascal Cygan.

References

1975 births
Living people
People from Lens, Pas-de-Calais
French footballers
Angers SCO players
SO Cholet players
Association football defenders
Sportspeople from Pas-de-Calais
Wasquehal Football players
Footballers from Hauts-de-France